Pennsylvania Route 969 (PA 969) is a  state highway located in Clearfield County, Pennsylvania.  The western terminus is at U.S. Route 219 (US 219) in Greenwood Township. The eastern terminus is at PA 453 in Curwensville.  The route is known locally as the Lumber City Highway.

Route description

PA 969 begins at an intersection with US 219 in the community of Bells Landing in Greenwood Township, heading east on two-lane undivided Lumber City Highway. The road winds northeast through forested areas, running a short distance to the north of a R.J. Corman Railroad line and the West Branch Susquehanna River. The route crosses into Penn Township before continuing northeast into Ferguson Township and the community of Lumber City, following the railroad line and the river east to an intersection with PA 729. Here, PA 729 turns east to form a brief concurrency with PA 969 before splitting to the south. After this, the route heads east through an area of fields before curving north into more forests. The road crosses into Pike Township and runs immediately to the west of the R.J. Corman Railroad line with Curwensville Lake a short distance to the east. The road and the railroad turn northeast and continue near more of the lake. PA 969 enters the borough of Curwensville and reaches its terminus at an intersection with PA 453.

Major intersections

See also

References

External links

Pennsylvania Highways: PA 969

969
Transportation in Clearfield County, Pennsylvania